5028 Halaesus  is a Jupiter trojan from the Greek camp, approximately  in diameter. It was discovered on 23 January 1988 by American astronomer Carolyn Shoemaker at the Palomar Observatory in California. The dark D-type asteroid has a rotation period of 24.9 hours and belongs to the 100 largest Jupiter trojans. It was named after Halaesus from Greek mythology.

Orbit and classification 

Halaesus is a Jovian asteroid orbiting in the leading Greek camp at Jupiter's  Lagrangian point, 60° ahead of its orbit in a 1:1 resonance . It is a non-family asteroid in the Jovian background population.

It orbits the Sun at a distance of 4.57–5.95 AU once every 12 years and 1 month (4,408 days; semi-major axis of 5.26 AU). Its orbit has an eccentricity of 0.13 and an inclination of 21° with respect to the ecliptic.

The body's observation arc begins with its official discovery observation at Palomar in January 1988.

Physical characteristics 

In the SDSS-based taxonomy, Halaesus is a D-type asteroid. Pan-STARRS' survey also characterized it as a D-type, the most common spectral type among the Jupiter trojan population. It has a typical V–I color index of 0.90.

Rotation period 

In September 1996, photometric observations of Halaesus were made by Italian astronomer Stefano Mottola, using the now decommissioned Bochum 0.61-metre Telescope at ESO's La Silla Observatory in Chile.

In August 2015, observations by the Kepler space telescope gave two period determinations of 25.052 and 29.95 hours with an amplitude of 0.23 and 0.19 magnitude, respectively.

Diameter and albedo 

According to the survey carried out by the NEOWISE mission of NASA's Wide-field Infrared Survey Explorer, Halaesus measures 50.77 kilometers in diameter and its surface has an albedo of 0.057. The Collaborative Asteroid Lightcurve Link adopts an albedo of 0.057 and a diameter 50.77 of kilometers based on an absolute magnitude of 10.2.

Naming 

This minor planet was named from Greek mythology after Halaesus, a son of king Agamemnon, after whom the asteroid 911 Agamemnon is named. The official naming citation was published by the Minor Planet Center on 4 June 1993.

References

External links 
 Asteroid Lightcurve Database (LCDB), query form (info )
 Dictionary of Minor Planet Names, Google books
 Discovery Circumstances: Numbered Minor Planets (5001)-(10000) – Minor Planet Center
 Asteroid 5028 Halaesus at the Small Bodies Data Ferret
 
 

005028
Discoveries by Carolyn S. Shoemaker
Named minor planets
19880123